Dhobian
Dhobian is a village of Abbottabad District in Khyber Pakhtunkhwa province of Pakistan. It is located at 34°6'25N 73°7'20E with an altitude of 1101 metres (3615 feet).

References

Populated places in Abbottabad District